Mount Lombard is the highest peak dominating the mountain mass whose southern extremity is Cape Sobral, Graham Land, Antarctica, and surmounting Mundraga Bay to the west. It was mapped from surveys by the Falkland Islands Dependencies Survey (1960–61), and was named by the UK Antarctic Place-Names Committee for American engineer Alvin O. Lombard of the Lombard Steam Log Hauler Company, Waterville, Maine, who designed some of the earliest successful over-snow tractors, the first application of knowledge of snow mechanics to trafficability, 1901–13.

References

Mountains of Graham Land
Nordenskjöld Coast